A five-foot way (Malay/Indonesian: kaki lima) is a roofed continuous walkway commonly found in front of shops in Malaysia, Singapore, and Indonesia which may also be used for commercial activity. The name refers to the width of the passageway, but a five-foot way may be narrower or wider than five feet. Although it looks like European arcade along the streets, it is a building feature that suits the local climate, and characterizes the town-scape and urban life of this region. It may also be found in parts of Thailand, Taiwan, and Southern China.

The term "five-foot" describes the width of the covered sidewalks. The overhanging canopy, roof extension or projected upper floor on top of the five-foot ways provides a cover to shield pedestrians from the sun and the rain. As the ground floor of most commercial buildings in downtown areas is occupied by shops or eating places, the five-foot ways also function as corridors for people to window shop or look for refreshment. These corridors were used by traders to set up various small businesses in the past, and are still used this way in many countries.

As the name implies, five-foot ways may have a minimum width of five feet, but the guideline has not been applied universally, as many five-foot ways are wider or narrower depending on the age, size, and function of the building.

History 
The requirement for arcades in urban plans may be found as early as 1573 in the Royal Ordinances by Philip II of Spain.

Batavia
Batavia (now Jakarta) became a capital of the Dutch East India Company in the early 17th century. As soon as Jan Pieterszoon Coen, Governor-General of the Dutch East India Company(VOC) occupied the port town of Jayakarta, he started construction of the capital in European way. In the middle of the 17th century, Johan Nieuhof, described two market buildings run parallel with central galleries. Nieuhof further mentioned that the building were divided into 'five walks'  or galleries. It has been speculated that the 'five walks' are the kaki lima, referring to the space rather than the width of the passage'.

When the British East India Company(EIC) ruled Dutch East Indies during the Napoleonic War, Thomas Stamford Raffles was appointed the Lieutenant-Governor of the Dutch East Indies in 1811–1815.  Raffles was in Batavia in 1811–1815 as a governor during the British Java period and may have observed the verandahs, footways and continuous eaves of the Batavia. It has been claimed that Raffles ordered the construction of walkways of around five feet wide in front of shops in Batavia.

Singapore
In 1819, Raffles founded modern Singapore, and it was in Singapore that the five-foot way became firmly established as an architectural feature of the region, when Stamford Raffles included this and other details in his Town Plan of 1822. Raffles issued a set of instructions on how the new colony may be organised in his plan for Singapore in 1822. He stipulated that the buildings in the newly established colony should be uniform, and should be built of brick and tiles to reduce fire risks. He added that:

This became the five-foot way, and this feature of shophouses in Singapore was observable by the 1840s from the drawings of Singapore John Turnbull Thomson.  The land leaseholder had to provide public walkways of certain width in front of their shops and houses. As they constructed the second floor above the public walkways, it formed roofed continuous walkways along the street. Although it was planned as a public walkway, the five-foot way would also become a place for hawkers to trade, and it was used as retail, storage, and even living spaces. Attempts in Singapore to clear the walkways of hawkers who were obstructing the walkway in the 1880s led to the so-called "Verandah Riots".

Other Straits Settlements
Ordinances and by-laws requiring such verandah walkways were then enacted from the mid-19th and early 20th century in the Straits Settlements and Malayan towns, for example, the 1884 building by-laws introduced by Frank Swettenham in the rebuilding of Kuala Lumpur provided for the inclusion of 5-foot passageways beside the road. However, the term "five-foot way" was not specifically mentioned in such ordinances and by-laws, rather words as arcade, verandah or verandah-way or five-foot-path were used. The term may have been coined by builders in response to the minimum width of the walkway. The walkway would become an integral feature of many settlements in neighbouring British colonies in the Malaya peninsula, and by the later half of the 19th century became a feature of the distinctive "Strait Settlement Style" buildings. It is still commonly found in the towns and cities of Malaysia.  Although it was originally a feature colonial-era buildings, many buildings in the post-colonial era in Malaysia still incorporated a sheltered walkway, although not necessarily in the form of an arcade.

Southern China, Taiwan and Hong Kong Colony
The Five Foot Way or Verandah regulation was also applied for town planning in Taiwan in the late 19th century and in South China in early 20th century under the Republic of China.  The verandah may be found as the qilou (arcade) of these regions. In the early colonial period of Hong Kong, any construction and projection was not allowed above the public walkways, but the colonial government issued "the Verandah Regulation" in 1878 to enable adjacent land leaseholder to build overhanging second floor above the walkways to cope with the lack of living space.

South East Asia
This architectural feature also spread to other South East Asian countries, such as Thailand, the Philippines, Brunei, and Burma after the mid-19th century. Such feature may have been introduced to Bangkok after the visit of Rama V to Singapore in 1871, while towns in southern Thailand were influenced by their proximity to Malaya.

It remains a prominent element in modern architecture in Singapore and Malaysia.

Communal Kaki Lima

Kaki Lima in Indonesia
The Indonesian usage of kaki lima is interchangeable with trotoar (from French via Dutch: trottoir), as both refer to walking paths or sidewalks. In Indonesian, the colloquial term pedagang kaki lima references street hawkers that often occupy the five-foot ways. The Kaki Lima in Indonesia historically offered a potpourri of goods such as shirts, socks, blouses, pots and pans. Nowadays, they are often occupied by small eateries and stands.

See also 

 Overhang (architecture)
 Portico
 Verandah

References

Sources
1. Johann Friedrich Geist, Arcades The History of a Building Type, 1989, 
2. Doren Greig, The Reluctant Colonists Netherlanders Abroad n the 17th and 18th centuries, 1987, 
3. Jean Gelman Taylor, The Social World of Batavia European and Eurasian in Dutch Asia, 1983, 
4. Hideo Izumida, Chinese Settlements and China-towns along Coastal Area of the South China Sea: Asian Urbanization Through Immigration and Colonization, 2006, (Japanese version), (Korean version)

Architectural elements
Architecture in Indonesia
Architecture in Singapore
Architecture in Malaysia